The wrestling tournament at the 1997 Mediterranean Games was held in Bari, Italy.

Medal table

Medalists

Men's freestyle

Men's Greco-Roman

References
1997 Mediterranean Games report at the International Committee of Mediterranean Games (CIJM) website
List of Olympians who won medals at the Mediterranean Games at Olympedia.org

Medi
Wrestling
1997
International wrestling competitions hosted by Italy